Cornfields is a chapter of the Navajo Nation and a census-designated place (CDP) in Apache County, Arizona, United States. The population was 255 at the 2010 census.

Cornfields is part of the Fort Defiance Agency, of the Bureau of Indian Affairs; Ganado, AZ is the delegate seat for the district that encompasses the Jeddito, Cornfields, Ganado, Kinlichee, Steamboat communities at the Navajo Nation Council.

Geography

Cornfields is part of the greater Ganado area which includes Ganado, Burnside, Cornfields, Kinlichee, Wood Springs, Klagetoh, and Steamboat and the family ranches dispersed amongst these sub-areas.

Education
It is in the Ganado Unified School District, which operates Ganado High School.

Demographics

References

Census-designated places in Apache County, Arizona
Populated places on the Navajo Nation